Sydney Harbour is the 10-mile long Y-shaped inlet of the Atlantic, oriented southwest-northeast on the northeast shore of Cape Breton Island, Nova Scotia, Canada. At its upper reaches, the harbour forks to form 2 arms, the Northwest Arm and the South Arm. The South Arm is fed upstream by the Sydney River.

Sydney Harbour is the maritime hub for the Cape Breton Regional Municipality. The South Arm affords year-round ice-free deep-water anchorage for large ships, including cruise ships.

The harbour's east shore formerly held a coke (fuel) and steel mill belonging to the Sydney Steel Corporation, operating from 1901-2001 with peak production from 1960-1980. Muggah Creek, near the steel mill, transported material (including polychlorinated biphenyl) into the Sydney Harbour, resulting in the area around the mouth of the creek to have some of the most contaminated marine sediment known (as of 2003).

The harbour underwent major dredging in 2011, clearing the channel to 17-meter depth and making it accessible to large container ships. Five port facilities currently operate on the shores of Sydney Harbour: the International Coal Pier, Nova Scotia Lands, Sydney Marine Terminal, Sydport Industrial Park (Edwardsville) and Marine Atlantic (North Sydney). The sixth, the new container terminal, NOVAPORTE™ Mega-Terminal, is being planned for Edwardsville.

References

Notes
Nautical chart #4266 SYDNEY HARBOUR, published by Canadian Hydrographic Service, 28 February 2014

Ports and harbours of Nova Scotia